There have been 136 women in the Dewan Negara since the establishment of the Parliament of Malaysia. As of 2018, there are 14 female senators, or 20.00% of the body.

Women have had the right to sit in Dewan Negara since 1959, however, it was not until Aishah Ghani to be appointed as the first female senator in 1962. Women have been appointed by the Yang di-Pertuan Agong and indirectly elected by all state legislatures to represent their states in the Dewan Negara. Since then, all states have had multiple female senators – in chronological order: Kedah (1975), Terengganu (1975), Pahang (1977), Sabah (1989), Kelantan (1991), Selangor (1991), Johor (1997), Negeri Sembilan (1999), Malacca (1999), Perlis (2005), Perak (2006), Sarawak (2010) and Penang (2015).

List of female senators

This is an incomplete list of women who have served as members of the Dewan Negara, ordered alphabetically. This list includes women who served in the past and who continue to serve in the present.

Elected by the State Legislative Assembly

Nominated by the Prime Minister and appointed by the Yang di-Pertuan Agong

References

 
Parliament of Malaysia
Dewan Negara